Lieutenant-General Sir Henry Clinton  (9 March 1771 – 11 December 1829) was a British Army officer and a general officer during the Napoleonic Wars.

He came from a family of soldiers. His elder brother was William Henry Clinton and his father was General Sir Henry Clinton the British Commander-in-Chief in North America during the American Revolutionary War, and his grandfather was Admiral of the Fleet George Clinton (1686–1761).

Early military career
Elliot was commander-in-chief and governor of Newfoundland from 1786 to 1788. Clinton suffered from severe seasickness and left the navy at the completion of three years with Captain Gower in Newfoundland.

He received his officer's commission in 1787. He went on to serve in the Flanders campaign as an aide-de-camp to the Prince Frederick, Duke of York and Albany, starting in 1793. He was promoted to lieutenant colonel in 1795. Captured by the French, he was a prisoner in 1796–1797. During the 1799 campaign in northern Italy, he was a liaison officer with Alexander Suvarov's Russian army. He went to India as adjutant general from 1802 to 1805.

At the Battle of Austerlitz in 1805, Clinton was the British military attaché to the Russian army. He commanded the garrison of Syracuse in Sicily in 1806–1807.

Parliamentary career
He became a member of parliament for Boroughbridge in 1808, holding the seat for the next 10 years.

Peninsula
During the campaign and Battle of Corunna in 1808–1809, he served as Sir John Moore's adjutant general and was promoted to major-general in 1810.

During the remainder of the Peninsular War he commanded an infantry division under the Marquess of Wellington (later the Duke of Wellington). He was first appointed to command the 6th Division on 9February 1812. During the Battle of Salamanca, his division played a key part by defeating French General Bertrand Clausel's counterattack. He then led his division in the Siege of Burgos campaign. From 26January to 25June 1813, Clinton was absent and Edward Pakenham took over the 6th Division. For his conduct at the Vitoria campaign, Clinton was made a Knight Grand Cross of the Order of the Bath (GCB).

He was absent again from 22July to October, when he again assumed command of the 6th Division. He was given the local rank of lieutenant general in 1813. He took part in the subsequent victories at the battles of the Nivelle, the Nive, Orthez and Toulouse. At the end of the Peninsular War he was made a lieutenant general and inspector-general of infantry, and was awarded the Army Gold Cross with one clasp.

Waterloo
In 1815 during the Battle of Waterloo, Clinton led the 2nd Division which Wellington posted in reserve behind his right flank. The 2nd Division included the 3rd British Brigade (Maj-Gen Frederick Adam), the 1st King's German Legion (KGL) Brigade (Col Du Plat), the 3rd Hanoverian Brigade (Col Hugh Halkett) and Lieut-Col Gold's two artillery batteries (Bolton RA and Sympher KGL). His troops helped to defeat and pursue Napoleon's Imperial Guard at the end of the battle.

Later life
In 1815 he was made Colonel of the Buffs (Royal East Kent Regiment), a position he held until his death.

He died at his country residence in Ashley, Hampshire on 11 December 1829. He had married Susan, the daughter of Francis Charteris, 7th Lord Elcho. They had no children.

Places named for Clinton
 Clinton, Ontario, Canada

Notes

References
 Chandler, David. Dictionary of the Napoleonic Wars. Macmillan, 1979.
 Glover, Michael. The Peninsular War 1807-1814. Penguin, 1974.
 Haythornethwaite, Philip. Uniforms of Waterloo in color. Hippocrene, 1974.
 Oman, Charles. Wellington's Army, 1809-1814. Greenhill, (1913) 1993.

External links 
 
 
 Clinton Papers, at the John Rylands Library, University of Manchester.

1771 births
1829 deaths
British Army lieutenant generals
British Army personnel of the French Revolutionary Wars
British Army commanders of the Napoleonic Wars
Buffs (Royal East Kent Regiment) officers
Knights Grand Cross of the Order of the Bath
Members of the Parliament of the United Kingdom for English constituencies
Tory MPs (pre-1834)
UK MPs 1807–1812
UK MPs 1812–1818
Recipients of the Army Gold Cross
Henry